Yanchan Rajmohan (born March 8, 1995), known professionally as Yanchan, is a Canadian singer, producer, songwriter, mixing engineer, and mridangam hand drummer. Known most for incorporating South Asian elements into his production work, Rajmohan creates Carnatic/Hip-Hop tracks.

Rajmohan helped build Emtee Education, an artist development and music education firm, as well as Dirty Elephant, a music conglomerate focused on bridging the gap between the North American and Indian music scenes.

Rajmohan's first EP Yours Truly was released in November 2016 through his independent label Dirty Elephant Records, where Rajmohan is both the lead producer and founder. His music grew in popularity due to the blending of genres and styles such as Carnatic music, songs from Tamil and Hindi cinema, Alternative R&B, Hip-Hop, Pop, Soul, Trap, and a few sub-genres of Electronic. His song "Reminiscence" became track of the week in 2016 on Ashanti Omkar's radio show on the BBC Asian Network.

Rajmohan released his debut album Sentimental Kids on November 15, 2019. On July 20, 2019, Rajmohan and Shan Vincent De Paul released the first episode of their Mrithangam Raps series where Rajmohan plays the mrithangam and De Paul raps. The rap series has gained millions of views and brought Rajmohan to the forefront of the Indian music market. Rajmohan's music had been featured on Complex, Rolling Stone, and Star Vijay.

Early life 

Yanchan Rajmohan was born in the Toronto suburb of Scarborough, Ontario on March 8, 1995, the son of Tamil immigrants. Rajmohan's parents fled their home country, Sri Lanka, as refugees from the civil war. He attended New High Castle Public School and later Woburn Collegiate Institute. After graduating from high school, Rajmohan attended Wilfrid Laurier University in Waterloo, Ontario, although he later dropped-out to attend Trebas College where he received his diploma in audio engineering.

At the age of six, Rajmohan began training in vocal and mridangam in Carnatic music. He was the youngest person to make his ‘’mridanga arangetram’’ (or debut performance), at the age of eight. He trained on the instrument obsessively with renowned players Neyveli B. Venkatesh, Trichy Sankaran, and Karaikudi Mani. Rajmohan also plays the khanjira, the ghatam and the thavil.

Career

2016: Early Beginnings 

In November 2016, Rajmohan released his first EP, Yours Truly. Rajmohan claimed, "The sound of my entire EP is rooted in the pain and experiences I’ve dealt with in the past. It is essentially a letter I wrote to all the people who tried keeping me down, a message to them and the world of what I’m capable of," hence the name Yours Truly as the title.

Rajmohan's debut EP contains a total of six songs, released by his studio Dirty Elephant Records. His song, "New Me," from the Yours Truly EP had a music video directed by Kid October and Gow Naguleswaran for SPICYWTR published on YouTube and Facebook.

2017 - 2018: Singles 

In 2017, Rajmohan released his singles "All Out" in July, "Same Old" in November. He recorded a music video for his single "All Out" directed by Kid October and NGLSWRN.

In 2018, he released “Get It” in February, “Coming Down” in April, and “Yacht” in September. In Rajmohan's single "Yacht," he "tells the story of his first experience riding a luxury Yacht with some of the most powerful individuals in the Music Industry." This single granted him a feature in HipHopCanada and Complex Canada.
Rajmohan is featured on Shan Vincent De Paul's single, "Slow Love," which Rajmohan also co-produced. Rajmohan first discovered De Paul when his sister showed him a publication he was featured on by Tamil Culture, and it became his goal to connect with him. A year from that day, Rajmohan went to De Paul's parents furniture store in Scarborough where he would meet his mom eventually leading to the two finally connecting.

2019: Sentimental Kids and Want You 

On January 10, 2019, Rajmohan and De Paul released their single "Want You." The artists experimented with this single, mixing Rap and Carnatic music– and the song went viral immediately.  Rajmohan released his debut album Sentimental Kids on November 15, 2019. The album includes three singles, "I Know," featuring De Paul, "Fantasy," and "Happen Like This" featuring S.A.M.

Mrithangam Raps 

After Rajmohan and De Paul's viral hit "Want You," the two began collaborating and working on Carnatic Hip-Hop music through their Mrithangam Rap episodes. Mrithangam Raps is an episode series where Rajmohan plays the percussion instrument, the mrithangam, and De Paul raps about Tamil culture, the immigrant experience, and representing brown rappers./ The two have collaborated on songs in the past and decided to, "try doing raps while [Rajmohan] plays the Mrithangam," recording themselves with a phone and posting it online, marking the start of their series. The first episode premiered on July 20, 2019. Currently, the episodes are released on YouTube and Facebook and have received global recognition from the Tamil diaspora.

The idea for the series came from Rajmohan's interest in "[wanting] to find a way to bridge the gap between the two sounds" as a hip-hop producer and mrithangam player. One day Rajmohan and De Paul did a raw stripped-down version of his song "I Know," which led to more experimentation with different genres of music.

The Mrithangam Raps episodes also received pushback from Carnatic music purists, who criticized how the mrithangam is used alongside curse words found in rap music. Regardless of the opposition, the Mrithangam Raps series kickstarted the growth of Rajmohan's career internationally.

2020: OH GAWD! India Tour, The India Beat Tape, Picasso, and Kothu Boys  

In February 2020, Rajmohan supported De Paul for his OH GAWD! India Tour along with DJ Dwell. The five city tour began in Pune at the VH1 Supersonic Festival. The VH1 Supersonic Festival was also the first-ever live performance of the Mrithangam Raps series. Rajmohan also performed alongside De Paul when performing songs from their new collaborative album Kothu Boys, which had yet to be released at the time.

Following the tour, Rajmohan released two solo albums in 2020, The India Beat Tape in May, and Picasso in July. In November, Rajmohan and De Paul released their collaborative album Kothu Boys, which features Episode 5 of the Mrithangam Raps series, "Destruction!" a single that was released in October 2019. Kothu Boys is a fusion album of hip-hop and traditional South Asian/Tamil music.

Discography

EPs
 Yours Truly (2016)

Albums
 Sentimental Kids (2019)
 The India Type Beat (2020)
 Picasso (2020)
 Kothu Boys (2020)

Tours

Supporting 
 Shan Vincent De Paul - OH GAWD! India Tour (2020)

References

1995 births
Living people
Canadian people of Sri Lankan Tamil descent